USS Eldorado (AGC-11) was a Mount McKinley-class amphibious force command ship, named after a mountain range in Nevada. The ship was designed as an amphibious force flagship, a floating command post with advanced communications equipment and extensive combat information spaces to be used by the amphibious forces commander and landing force commander during large-scale operations.

WW II, commissioning
The Eldorado was launched on October 26, 1943 as Monsoon by the North Carolina Shipbuilding Company in Wilmington, North Carolina, under a Maritime Commission contract, sponsored by Mrs. P. A. Peeples; transferred to the US Navy on February 1, 1944; converted by Bethlehem Steel Corporation in Brooklyn, New York; and commissioned on  August 25, 1944, with Captain Jesse Wallace in command.

1944
The Eldorado sailed from Naval Station Norfolk on September 15, 1944, and arrived at San Diego on September 29 to embark Rear Admiral Lawrence F. Reifsnider who broke his flag as Commander, Amphibious Group 4.  In November, it sailed to Pearl Harbor and there became the flagship for Vice Admiral Richmond K. Turner, Commander, Amphibious Forces, Pacific.

1945

On January 27, 1945, after rehearsal landings in Hawaii, the command ship sailed for the Marianas and further preparations for the landing on Iwo Jima. The ship also carried General Holland Smith, USMC, and his staff, and Secretary of the Navy James Forrestal and his party when it sailed from Saipan on February 16 for Iwo Jima. The Eldorado lay off Iwo Jima from February 19 to March 9, its passengers directing operations ashore and afloat. It served as headquarters for war correspondents, and broadcast directly from the beachhead to the people at home through its facilities. One of these correspondents was Joe Rosenthal of the Associated Press, who took the famous American flag-raising photo on Mount Suribachi.
 
The Eldorado arrived at Guam on March 12, 1945, and embarked Lieutenant General Simon B. Buckner, Commanding General of the 10th Army, then after rehearsals at Leyte in the Philippines, sailed off to the Hagushi Beaches, Okinawa, for the initial invasion landings on April 1. The ship carried out the same type of duties it had performed at Iwo Jima. Since both the Commander, Air Support Control Unit, and the Force Fighter Director Officer were embarked, Eldorados combat information center was the central unit in the air defense against the day and night air raids. General Buckner and his staff debarked on  April 18 to establish headquarters on the island itself, and until the ship's departure on May 18, it was visited by several guests, including Admirals Chester W. Nimitz, William F. Halsey, Jr. and Raymond A. Spruance and war correspondent Ernie Pyle.
 
Post-war
In 1945, at the end of the war, the Eldorado was at Manila preparing for the proposed invasion of the Japanese home islands. It returned to Pearl Harbor in October where Admiral Turner and his staff debarked.
 
Alternately at Pearl Harbor and at west coast ports, the Eldorado continued to serve as the flagship for succeeding amphibious commanders in the Pacific. There were two exceptions: From April to September 1947 and again from January to July 1949, it flew the flag of Commander, Naval Forces, Western Pacific, and cruised to Chinese waters. During the second tour, the Eldorado departed Shanghai only a short time before that city fell to the Communists.

Korean War 
With the outbreak of the Korean War in June 1950, the Eldorado was ordered to the Far East.  The Eldorado was the flagship for Rear Admiral Lyman A. Thackrey, Commander, Amphibious Group 3, and it acted as standby for the  during the invasion of Inchon, South Korea, and coordinated and controlled the logistics operations.  In October 1950, it sailed to Riwon to support the continued northwest advance of United Nations troops. Returning to Japan in November, the Eldorado was ordered again to Inchon to direct the evacuation.  It was at Inchon again in the spring and summer of 1951, and in June hoisted the flag of Vice Admiral Ingolf N. Kiland, Commander, Amphibious Forces, Pacific Fleet.  The Eldorado was visited by Generals Matthew B. Ridgway and Van Fleet, and the commanding generals of the British troops and Turkish Brigades during its stay at Inchon, and sent the first pictures of the s:Korean Armistice Agreement talks to the outside world.
 
The Eldorado returned to the States and became the flagship for Rear Admiral W. E. Moore, Commander, Amphibious Group 1, in October 1952. It sailed for the Far East where Admiral Moore assumed command of TF 90's amphibious forces.  During this tour, the Eldorado assisted the Japanese Government during the floods at Fukuoka, and directed Operation Big Switch, the transportation of Chinese and Korean prisoners of war from the camps at Cheju Do and Koje-do to the port of Inchon for repatriation.

Post-war
The Eldorado returned to the west coast in the fall of 1953, and continued to serve as the flagship for Amphibious Group 1, now commanded by Rear Admiral Lorenzo Sabin, Jr., until June 1954. It embarked Vice Admiral Thomas G. W. Settle, Commander, Amphibious Forces, Pacific, until August. On February 15, 1955, the Eldorado sailed for Keeling, Formosa, where it operated as the flagship for Vice Admiral Alfred M. Pride, Commander, 7th Fleet, until August 17. The Eldorado returned to San Diego for amphibious exercises, and on December 13,  Rear Admiral George C. Towner broke his flag on board as Commander, Amphibious Group 3 and Eastern Pacific.
 
In the summer of 1956, the Eldorado sailed to arctic waters with Army officers embarked, to resupply bases at Wainwright, Alaska, and Point Barrow, Alaska. From December 1956 to January 1957, it was the flagship for Vice Admiral Carl F. Espe, Commander, Amphibious Forces, Pacific, and during the next month, for Vice Admiral Robert L. Dennison, Commander, United States First Fleet.  From June 1957 through 1960, the Eldorado served as the flagship for four successive commanders of Amphibious Group 1, Rear Admirals Frederick C. Stelter, Jr., Charles K. Duncan, Charles O. Triebel, and Charles C. Kirkpatrick. The only interruption to this service was in October and November 1958, when it served Vice Admiral John Sylvester, Commander, Amphibious Forces, Pacific, as flagship.
 
In addition to operations along the west coast from her home port at San Diego, the Eldorado took part in Arctic supply operations once more in the summer of 1957, and cruised to the Far East from January to May 1958, and again from December 1959 into 1960. During the second of these, as the flagship, the Eldorado participated in exercise "Blue Star," a joint Navy-Marine and Nationalist Chinese Navy-Marine amphibious operation off southern Taiwan. In April and May, the Eldorado visited ports in Indonesia and Australia, participating in Australia's 18th annual celebration of the Battle of the Coral Sea before returning to San Diego on May 31 where it remained.  The Eldorado was the flagship for the eight-week expedition for the 5th MEB during the Cuban Missile Crisis and then participating in local operations through 1962.

Vietnam War
In 1967, the ship received the Navy Meritorious Unit Commendation for its role in twelve amphibious assaults in Vietnam, in conjunction with the Amphibious Ready Group and the Marine Special Landing Force.

In January 1969, Eldorado's designation was changed to LCC-11'''. Also, in 1969, USS Eldorado LCC11 was awarded the Navy Unit Commendation for her actions concerning command and control during Operation Bold Mariner, the largest amphibious landing since WWII. The operation occurred in the Batangan Peninsula area of South Vietnam.

 
The Eldorado'' received two battle stars for its World War II service and eight battle stars for its Korean War service.

References

External links
navsource.org: USS Eldorado

 

Mount McKinley-class command ships
Ships built in Wilmington, North Carolina
1943 ships
World War II amphibious warfare vessels of the United States
Cold War amphibious warfare vessels of the United States
Korean War amphibious warfare vessels of the United States